"Six Moons: The Best of 1988–1994" is a greatest hits album by Australian singer-songwriter Daryl Braithwaite. The album includes tracks taken from taken albums Edge, Rise and Taste the Salt and three new tracks, "How Can I Be Sure", "Blue Hills" and "Escape From Reality" all recorded in July and August 1994.
The album peaked at number 31 in Australia.

Track listing
 "As the Days Go By"  (Extended Mix)  (I.Thomas)
 "All I Do" (I. Thomas)
 "One Summer" (D. Braithwaite)
 "Let Me Be" (S. Hussey)
 "Sugar Train" (J. Scott)
 "Rise" (P. Read, D. McCarthy)	
 "The Horses" (Rickie Lee Jones)
 "Higher Than Hope" (Single Mix)  (S. Hussey, D. Braithwaite)
 "Don't Hold Back Your Love" (D. Tyson, R. Page, G. O'Brien)
 "Nothing To Lose" (Mike Caen, Steve Bull)
 "The World as It Is" (T. Harris, G. O'Brien)
 "Barren Ground" (B.R. Hornsby, J. Hornsby)
 "How Can I Be Sure"	(Felix Cavaliere, Edward Brigati Jr.)
 "Blue Hills" (Tim Finn)
 "Escape From Reality" (Roger Mason)

Charts

External links

Musicians
Simon Hussey, Jeff Scott, David Hussey, John Farnham, Glenn Braithwaite, John Watson, Scott Griffiths Chuck Hargreaves, John Corniola, Andy Cichon, Brett Kingman, Laurence Maddy, Margaret Urlich, The Brasstards, Alex Pertout, Jeremy Alsop, Tommy Emmanuel, Stuart Fraser, Lisa Edwards, Nikki Nicoles, Richard Pleasance, Willie Zygier, Nicky Karawana.

References

Daryl Braithwaite albums
Compilation albums by Australian artists
1994 greatest hits albums
Columbia Records albums